Major-General Charles Edward Lawrie  (1864 – 12 April 1953) was a senior British Army officer.

Military career
Educated at Cheam School, Eton College and the Royal Military Academy, Woolwich, Lawrie was commissioned into the Royal Artillery on 15 February 1884. He saw action with the Jebu Expedition in Nigeria in 1892, the Dongola Expedition in 1896 and the Nile Expedition in 1898 before service in the Second Boer War in 1899. He went on to be Director, Royal Artillery for 19th Division and then Brigadier, Royal Artillery with II Corps before becoming General Officer Commanding 63rd (Royal Naval) Division in February 1917 on the Western Front during the First World War. He commanded the division at the Battle of Arras in April 1917 when a German advance was repulsed but at considerable cost to the division. His youngest son was the cricketer Percy Lawrie.

References

1864 births
1953 deaths
British Army generals of World War I
Companions of the Order of the Bath
Companions of the Distinguished Service Order
Royal Artillery officers
People educated at Eton College
British Army major generals
British Army personnel of the Second Boer War